The 1970 Football League Cup Final took place on 7 March 1970 at Wembley Stadium with an attendance of 97,963. It was the tenth Football League Cup final and the fourth to be played at Wembley. It was contested between Manchester City and West Bromwich Albion. Manchester City won their first of two trophies that season; on 29 April they would win the 1970 European Cup Winners' Cup Final 2–1 against Górnik Zabrze.

Jeff Astle opened the scoring for Albion after five minutes, becoming the first player to score in the final of both the League Cup and FA Cup at Wembley. He had already scored in the first leg of the 1966 League Cup Final four years previously, however that was at West Ham's Boleyn Ground. City equalised through Mike Doyle to send the game into extra-time, and eventually won 2–1, with Glyn Pardoe scoring the winner.

Players and officials

Background
Honours were shared in the league matches between the two sides during the 1969–70 league season, with Manchester City gaining a 2–1 victory at Maine Road and West Bromwich Albion winning 3–0 at The Hawthorns. City went on to achieve a 10th-place finish in the First Division, while Albion finished 16th. The only previous meeting between the two sides in the League Cup had taken place at the third round stage of the 1966–67 competition; on that occasion, Albion progressed by a 4–2 scoreline and went on to reach that season's final.

References

EFL Cup Finals
League Cup Final 1970
League Cup Final 1970
1969–70 Football League
Football League Cup Final
Football League Cup Final